Pratiksha is a female given name in Hindi and Nepali languages.

Notable people with the name include:
 Pratiksha Apurv, Indian painter
 Pratiksha Santosh Shinde, Indian athlete
 Pratiksha Jadhav, Indian film actress
 Prateeksha Lonkar, Indian Marathi film and television actress

Indian feminine given names
Nepalese feminine given names